
Gmina Harasiuki is a rural gmina (administrative district) in Nisko County, Subcarpathian Voivodeship, in south-eastern Poland.

Villages
Gmina Harasiuki contains the villages and settlements of Banachy, Derylaki, Gózd, Harasiuki, Hucisko, Huta Krzeszowska, Huta Podgórna, Krzeszów Górny, Kusze, Łazory, Maziarnia, Nowa Huta, Nowa Wieś, Nowy Żuk, Półsieraków, Rogóźnia, Ryczki, Sieraków, Stara Huta, Stary Żuk, Szeliga and Wólka.

History
Harasiuki comes from the family name of Harasiuk.  The Harasiuks were the first family to inhabit the area. For instance, Matthew Harasiuk moved to Ohio and the American version of the name became Harasuk. Both versions of the name were used by the family. No known males heirs remain from this line.

Neighbouring gminas
Gmina Harasiuki is bordered by the gminas of Biłgoraj, Biszcza, Janów Lubelski, Jarocin, Krzeszów, Potok Górny and Ulanów.

References

Polish official population figures 2006

Harasiuki
Nisko County